The 2018 Challenger Banque Nationale de Saguenay was a professional tennis tournament played on indoor hard courts. It was the thirteenth edition of the tournament and was part of the 2018 ITF Women's Circuit. It took place in Saguenay, Quebec, Canada, on 22–28 October 2018.

Singles main draw entrants

Seeds 

 1 Rankings as of 15 October 2018.

Other entrants 
The following players received a wildcard into the singles main draw:
  Carson Branstine
  Jada Bui
  Petra Januskova
  Alexandra Vagramov

The following players received entry from the qualifying draw:
  Hayley Carter
  Jessica Ho
  Daria Lopatetska
  Kennedy Shaffer

Champions

Singles

 Katherine Sebov def.  Quirine Lemoine, 7–6(12–10), 7–6(7–4)

Doubles

 Tara Moore /  Conny Perrin def.  Sharon Fichman /  Maria Sanchez, 6–0, 5–7, [10–7]

External links 
 2018 Challenger Banque Nationale de Saguenay at ITFtennis.com
 Official website

Challenger Banque Nationale de Saguenay, 2018
Challenger Banque Nationale de Saguenay, 2018
Challenger de Saguenay